Masuzō, Masuzo or Masuzou is a masculine Japanese given name. Notable people with the name include:

Masuzo Madono, Japanese footballer
 (1895–1964), Japanese chemist

Japanese masculine given names